Jach'a Ch'apini (Aymara jach'a big, ch'api thorn, -ni a suffix, "the big one with thorns", also spelled Jachcha Chapini) is a mountain in the Bolivian Andes which reaches a height of approximately . It is located in the La Paz Department, Loayza Province, Luribay Municipality. Jach'a Ch'apini lies at the Luribay River, southwest of Jach'a Qullu and northwest of Ch'apini.

References 

Mountains of La Paz Department (Bolivia)